Fairfax Davis Downey (1893–1990) was a writer and military historian. Fairfax Downey graduated from Yale, where he was an editor of campus humor magazine The Yale Record. After college, he served in the U.S. Army as a captain of the 12th Field Artillery in World War 1. He was a recipient of the Silver Star for gallantry during the Battle of Belleau Wood. During the Second World War he served in North Africa, retiring as a lieutenant colonel. He worked as a newspaper reporter in Kansas City and New York City and retired to West Springfield, New Hampshire in the 1950s, where his wife's family had summered for a number of years at the family home Adamsfort. He was married at the time of his death to Washington DC socialite Mildred Adams, daughter of Dr. Samuel S. Adams, and had one daughter and four grandchildren.

He wrote biographies of Richard Harding Davis, Charles Dana Gibson, and Richard Francis Burton. His books on history and military history included Our Lusty Forefathers, (1947), Sound of the Guns (1956), and Storming of the Gateway (1960).

Fairfax Davis Downey, lieutenant colonel, United States Army, is buried in Arlington National Cemetery. Fairfax Downey was the son of General George F. Downey and the grandson of Captain, Brevet Major, George Mason Downey, 14th, 32nd, and 21st Infantry, U.S. Army (1861–1888).

Bibliography

History

Dogs of Destiny
Cats of Destiny
Mascots, illustrated by Augusto Marin, Coward-McCann (1954), hardcover, 150 pages
Dogs for Defense
Sound of the Guns; the story of American artillery from the ancient and honorable company to the atom cannon and guided missile, David McKay Company (1956), hardcover
General Crook, Indian Fighter, The Westminster Press, Philadelphia, (1957), hardcover, 192 pages
The Guns at Gettysburg
Clash of the Cavalry: Battle of Brady Station, June 9, 1863
Famous Horses of the Civil War
Storming of the Gateway: Chattanooga, 1863, David McKay Co (1960), hardcover
Indian wars of the U. S. Army, 1776–1865, Doubleday (1963), hardcover, 248 pages
Louisbourg: Key to a Continent, Prentice-hall, Inc., hardcover
Cannonade; great artillery actions of history, the famous cannons, and the Master Gunners
Fife, Drum & Bugle
Our Lusty Forefathers: Being Diverse Chronicles of the Fervors, Frolics, Fights, Festivities, and Failings of Our American Ancestors, Books for Libraries Press (1947), Ayer Co Pub (1971), hardcover, 359 pages,  
The Red/Bluecoats: the Indian Scouts, U.S. Army
Texas and the War with Mexico, with Paul M. Angle & The Editors of American Heritage, American Heritage Junior Library (June 1961), hardcover, 153 pages, 
The Buffalo Soldiers in the Indian Wars, McGraw-Hill (1969), hardcover, 127 pages

Biographies
The Grande Turke: Suleyman the Magnificent, Sultan of the Ottomans
Burton, Arabian Nights Adventurer
Richard Harding Davis: His Day, Charles Scribner's Sons (1933), hard cover, 321 pages
Portrait of an Era as Drawn by C.D. Gibson: A Biography, Charles Scribner's Sons (1936)

Anthologies
My Kingdom for a Horse: Greatest Horse Stories of All Time, edited by Fairfax Downey, Doubleday (1960), hardcover
Great dog stories of all time, Doubleday (1962)
Races to the Swift: Great Stories of the Turf, Doubleday (1967), hardcover

Historical novels, juveniles
War Horse
Dog of War, illustrated by Paul Brown, Dodd, Mead & Co (1943), hardcover, 153 pages
Jezebel the Jeep
Army Mule
Cavalry Mount
The Seventh's Staghound
Free and Easy: The Story of a Narragansett Pacer, illustrated by Frederick Chapman, Charles Scribner's Sons (1951), hard cover
Trail of the Iron Horse
A Horse for General Lee
The Shining Filly
Guns for General Washington

Humor and light verse
A Comic History of Yale
Father's First Two Years
When We Were Rather Older, illustrated by Jefferson Machamer, Minton, Balch & Co, NY (1926), hard cover
Young Enough to Know Better
Laughing Verse, collected by Fairfax Downey, Thomas Y. Crowell Company, New York (1946) hardcover, 86 pages

Miscellaneous
It Happened in New Hampshire
Contribution, Reunion in Print, Yale, 1916, Twenty-Five Year Book
Editor, Julia Marlowe's Story

Essays, reporting and other contributions

Notes

External links
Works by Fairfax Downey on Librarything.com
Fairfax Downey Papers (1967–1971)

Recipients of the Silver Star
Burials at Arlington National Cemetery
United States Army colonels
The New Yorker people
1893 births
1990 deaths
People from Springfield, New Hampshire
20th-century American male writers